A gravity-based structure (GBS) is a support structure held in place by gravity, most notably offshore oil platforms. These structures are often constructed in fjords due to their protected area and sufficient depth.

Offshore oil platforms 
Prior to deployment, a study of the seabed must be done to ensure it can withstand the vertical load from the structure. It is then constructed with steel reinforced concrete into tanks or cells, some of which are used to control the buoyancy. When construction is complete, the structure is towed to its intended location.

Wind turbines 

Early deployments of offshore wind power turbines used these structures. As of 2010, 14 of the world's offshore wind farms had some of their turbines supported by gravity-based structures. The deepest registered offshore wind farm with gravity-based structures is Thornton Bank 1, Belgium, with a depth up to 27.5 m.

See also
 Offshore concrete structure
 List of tallest oil platforms
 Troll A platform
 Gullfaks C
 Hibernia (oil field)

References

Offshore engineering
Structural engineering
Oil platforms